Ulva Ferry is a hamlet on the Hebridean island of Mull, on its west coast.

Ulva Ferry is on the shore of Ulva Sound (Caolas Ulbha) and the ferry connects Mull and the island of Ulva (Ulbha). Ulva Primary School is located at Ulva Ferry, rather than on the island of Ulva itself.

External links 

360 degree panorama of Ulva Sound featuring Ulva Ferry

Villages on the Isle of Mull